The knockout stage of the 2017 Sudirman Cup was the final stage of the competition, following the group stage. It began on 25 May with the quarter-finals and ended on 28 May with the final match of the tournament, held at Carrara Sport and Leisure Centre in Gold Coast, Australia. The top two teams from each group (8 in total) advanced to the final knockout stage to compete in a single-elimination tournament. The teams from group 2 and 3 (14 in total) advanced to the final classification stage to compete in a single-elimination tournament.

Qualified teams

Group 1

Group 2

Group 3

Bracket

Group 1

Group 2

Group 3

Classification round

Twenty-fifth place match: Guam vs Fiji

Twenty-third place match: New Caledonia vs Slovakia

Twenty-first place match: Macau vs Sri Lanka

Nineteenth place match: New Zealand vs Austria

Seventeenth place match: Scotland vs United States

Fifteenth place match: Canada vs Australia

Thirteenth place match: Vietnam vs Singapore

Quarter-finals

China vs India

Japan vs Malaysia

Korea vs Chinese Taipei

Thailand vs Denmark

Semi-finals

China vs Japan

Korea vs Thailand

Final: Korea def. China

References

External links
 

Sudirman Cup
Sudirman Cup knockout stage